Amblycorypha oblongifolia, the oblong-winged katydid, is a species of insect of the family Tettigoniidae (katydids or bush-crickets).

Appearance
The oblong-winged katydid is either green, tan, pink, or a dark tan or orange. Green is the most common amongst this species of katydid. Pink and tan are rare, but dark tan or orange is very rare. The origin of the unusual color stem from genetics, not from gender, age, or environment. The color is apparent from birth, and throughout their life.

Distribution
The oblong-winged katydid is common throughout the northeast of North America, but also can be found in the Midwest.

References
https://web.archive.org/web/20081011034925/http://buzz.ifas.ufl.edu/007a.htm
http://bugguide.net/node/view/71210/bgpage

http://content.denison.edu/cdm4/item_viewer.php?CISOROOT=/insectary3&CISOPTR=640&CISOBOX=1&REC=3
http://www.whatsthatbug.com/2006/01/16/oblong-winged-katydid-orange-tan-morph/
http://msucares.com/newsletters/pests/gloworm/2008/glow0508.pdf

Tettigoniidae
Insects described in 1773
Taxa named by Charles De Geer